Knaith is a village and civil parish about  south of the town of Gainsborough in the West Lindsey district of Lincolnshire, England. The population of the civil parish at the 2011 census was 335.

Knaith is a community with roots in Anglo-Saxon England. Well no longer exists as a named location, but can be identified on the ground. The Lord of Knaith in both 1066 and 1086 was the St Mary's Abbey of Stow, and the Tenant in Chief in 1086 was the Bishop of Lincoln (St Mary).

There are earthwork remains of Knaith medieval village. These include a medieval deer park created in the early 13th century, which became a possession of John Darcy, 1st Baron Darcy de Knayth, and his heirs. South of Knaith Hall are garden remains from the 16th or 17th century, and the remains of an 18th-century deer park.

Knaith Hall is a red-brick 15th-century building with some timber framing and is now Grade II listed.

The Church of England parish church of St Mary is 11th century, with alterations from the 14th and 18th, and an 1894 restoration. It is a Grade II* listed building. St Mary's might be the transept or nave of the church of Heynings Priory, a Cistercian nunnery founded probably around 1150.

References

Further reading

External links

Civil parishes in Lincolnshire
Villages in Lincolnshire
West Lindsey District